Second Guess is a British family game show that aired on The Family Channel from 1993 to 1994. It was hosted by Andrew O'Connor. The first show aired on 5 November 1993 at 9pm to an audience of 1.8 million viewers. It was won by the Sorsky Family who consisted of brothers Elliot, Michael and Richard. The most memorable episode was that of the McGuckin family headed by eldest son Steven McGuckin, now a decorated RAF pilot, who clutched victory from the jaws of defeat in episode 3 of series 2 shown on 22 September 1994. The show was filmed in front of a live studio audience.

External links

1993 British television series debuts
1994 British television series endings
1990s British game shows